Vernescu is a Romanian surname. Notable people with the surname include:

Aurel Vernescu (1939–2008), Romanian sprint canoeist
George D. Vernescu (1829–1900), Wallachian-born Romanian politician

Romanian-language surnames